Bulbul is a 2013 Indian Kannada-language romantic comedy film directed by M. D. Shridhar. It is a partial remake of the Telugu film Darling with the scenes in the flashback inspired from 50 First Dates. The film stars Darshan, Ambareesh and debutant Rachita Ram. The music for the film was composed by V. Harikrishna with lyrics penned by Kaviraj.

Plot
Amarnath and his college friends organize a reunion after several years . Amarnath lives with his wife, Chitra and son, Vijay, who is also his closest friend. Vijay is in love with his childhood friend, Kaveri daughter of Amar's friend Vishwanath (settled in Switzerland) who doesn't show much liking towards Vijay. Meanwhile, Vijay manages to save Nisha during a drag racing competition from a rival gang resulting in she falling for him. However he refuses to accept her love as he considers her as a good friend. Nisha attempts suicide but manages to survive. Nisha's father kidnaps Vijay's friends and in order to save them he fakes a love story. He manages to fool them by narrating the story of Kaveri, his lover who landed in a comatose state because of him (inspired by 50 First Dates).

Vijay tries hard to impress Kaveri during the reunion his efforts fail because her younger brother and his father's friend Appa Rao's son, Rishi. Rishi is in good books of Vishwanath and also has feelings for Kaveri. Meanwhile, Vijay succeeds in uniting Priya, daughter of Amar's friend Ramesh with her lover which impresses Kaveri. Slowly as ice starts to melt between them Nisha realises the truth and swears to seek revenge. Rishi's friend tries to kill Vijay resulting in Amar getting an electric shock. An angry Vijay who discovers the truth thrashes Rishi and his friends much to the agitation of Amar who asks his son to leave the house. Before leaving, his mother reveals that Vishwanath wished to marry Kaveri to Rishi and knowing that Vijay's presence is a possible threat to this decision and also to consolidate their friendship Amar uses the fight as an opportunity to banish Vijay. Vijay happily accepting his father's decision leaves the house. He comes across Kaveri who reciprocates his love. But he walks away without mentioning anything. A crestfallen Kaveri who returns to the house finds that her marriage with Rishi has been fixed. However Kaveri proclaiming her love for Vijay refuses to accept Rishi. Vishwanath understanding his mistake decides to choose Vijay as his son-in-law. Nisha's father arrives at this occasion and kidnaps Kaveri. Amar picks up Vijay who was waiting in the bus stop and takes him to the gangstar's hideout. Vijay manages to overpower them and reunite with Kaveri and his family.

Cast
 Darshan as Vijay
 Ambareesh as Amarnath
 Rachita Ram as Kaveri
 Ramya Berna as Nisha
 Sharath Lohitashwa as Nisha's father
 Ashok as Vishwanath
 Tennis Krishna as Apparao
 Sadhu Kokila as Subbayya 
 Sharan as Bobby 
 Ramesh Bhat as Ramesha
 Sridhar Rao as Rishi
 Chitra Shenoy as Chitra 
 Spoorthi as Priya 
 Chikkanna as Chikka
 Haridas G.
 Bahubali 
 Stunt Siddu 
 Ramesh Babu

Production

Casting
The producer wanted to bring back both Darshan and Ramya after 6 years, but Ramya opted out of the project. Actor Ambareesh was signed to play the father role to Darshan. Bollywood actor Pradeep Rawat was originally the main antagonist. However, he was dropped out, following a minor scuffle during the shoot and Sharath Lohitashwa was replaced instead. The film is produced by Dinakar Toogudeep.

Filming 
The official shooting of the film began on 28 December 2012 at the Bengaluru International Airport with few scenes featuring actor Pradeep Rawat at the Jade Gardens near the airport. However it was disrupted following a scuffle between the crew members and Rawat. It resumed with actor Sharath Lohitashwa replacing Rawat. On 21 February 2013, filming been completed.

Release
The film made its theatrical release across Karnataka in over 180 cinema halls on 10 May 2013.

Soundtrack

Reception

Critical response 

A critic from The Times of India scored the film at 4 out of 5 stars and says "Darshan for his marvellous and lively performance. Ambareesh steals the show with his graceful performance. Rachita Ram is amazing with her dialogue delivery, body language and excellent expressions. V Harikrishna has given some excellent tunes to the lyrics of Kaviraj. Krishnakumar’s cinematography is amazing". A Sharadhaa from The New Indian Express wrote "Cinematographer AV Krishna Kumar has explored good locations in Switzerland. Action by Ravi Varma needs a special mention. There could have been a little more effort at the editing desk. The Verdict: Forget the story, watch for the mass entertainment and don't miss the magic treat of Darshan and Ambareesh". B S Srivani from Deccan Herald wrote "Star just like in  Veera Parampare with Sudeep — just to savour their acting prowess, but that is not to be. Was one of them underutilised here? No complaints when the Bul Bul finally makes the hero’s heart her nest". A critic from Bangalore Mirror wrote  "Though the pair of Darshan and newbie Richi Ram looks out of sync in parts, the latter looks bubbly. On the flipside, the story is a bit clichéd, with too many make-believe scenes. A family entertainer, it’s definitely a big treat for Darshan fans".

References

External links 
 

Kannada remakes of Telugu films
2013 films
2013 romantic drama films
Films set in Bangalore
Films scored by V. Harikrishna
2010s Kannada-language films
Films directed by M. D. Sridhar
Indian romantic drama films